Steg för steg the second studio album by Swedish pop singer Carola Häggkvist, released on 12 April 1984. The album was produced by Lasse Holm and Lennart Sjöholm. On the album charts, the album peaked at number 1 in Sweden and number 2 in Norway.

Scandinavian Track listing
 Tommy tycker om mig
 Jag har funnit mig själv
 Det regnar i Stockholm
 I am a Woman, I am
 Som en fjäril
 Radio Love
 Steg för steg
 Thunder and Lightning
 Tokyo
 Ännu en dag
 I think I Like it
 När festen tagit slut
 60's Medley

International Track listing
 Tommy Loves me
 You're Still On My Mind 
 It's Raining In Stockholm 
 I am a Woman, I am
 Butterfly
 Radio Love
 One By Love 
 Thunder and lightning
 Tokyo
 Let There Be Love 
 I think I Like it
 Morning Star 
 60's Medley

Release history

Charts

References

1984 albums
Carola Häggkvist albums